The House at 79–81 Salem Street, also known as the Samuel Allen House, in Reading, Massachusetts was a modest Greek Revival two-family cottage. The wood-frame house was built sometime between 1830 and 1854 was a typical vernacular Greek Revival house, with a five-bay facade and a paired central entrance. When the house was listed on the National Register of Historic Places in 1984, the two entrances were flanked by pilasters supporting an unusually tall entablature; the house was later covered in synthetic siding, and a projecting portion at the top of the entablature was removed. The structure was completely torn down in 2021 for new construction.

See also
National Register of Historic Places listings in Reading, Massachusetts
National Register of Historic Places listings in Middlesex County, Massachusetts

References

Houses on the National Register of Historic Places in Reading, Massachusetts
Houses in Reading, Massachusetts
1845 establishments in Massachusetts
Greek Revival houses in Massachusetts